The 2016 KOSÉ Team Challenge Cup was held April 22–24, 2016 at the Spokane Arena in Spokane, Washington. Skaters competed as part of Team Asia, Team Europe, or Team North America.

The 2016 competition was the first edition of the event. Spokane was named as the host in September 2015.

Entries

Changes to initial assignments

Results

Individual Results 
Source:

Men

Ladies

Head-to-head competition
On Friday, April 22, singles skaters competed in a head-to-head competition. There were six rounds, with one skater from each team competing. Each skater earned points for their team based on placement. The team with the most placement points won the head-to-head competition. Also, the top scoring man and woman earned an additional cash prize. The scores from this event do not contribute to Saturday's team competition.

Overall results
Each skater earned points for their team based on placement in their group: 12 points for first place, 10 points for second place, and 8 points for third place. Shoma Uno and Evgenia Medvedeva had the highest scores of the night, earning them an additional cash prize.

Match-ups

Team Challenge competition
On Saturday, April 23, skaters competed with their free skating/dance programs. The team with the highest aggregate score won this segment of the Team Challenge Cup. Also, the top scoring pairs and dance couple earned an additional cash prize. The scores from Friday's event do not contribute to the event's final results.

Overall results
For each team, the highest dance score, the highest pair score, the two highest ladies scores, and the two highest men scores were combined. Meagan Duhamel / Eric Radford and Kaitlyn Weaver / Andrew Poje earned an additional cash prize for being the highest scoring pair and dance couple. Team North America was the overall winner of the competition.

Discipline results

References

External links 
 
 Results  at U.S. Figure Skating

Team Challenge Cup, 2016
Team Challenge Cup
Sports competitions in Spokane, Washington
International figure skating competitions hosted by the United States
2016 in sports in Washington (state)